Adhemar Martins, known as Japonês, (born 9 December 1900, date of death unknown) was a Brazilian footballer. He played in two matches for the Brazil national football team in 1920. He was also part of Brazil's squad for the 1920 South American Championship.

References

External links
 

1900 births
Year of death missing
Brazilian footballers
Brazil international footballers
Place of birth missing
Association footballers not categorized by position